Liezel Huber and Magdalena Maleeva were the defending champions, but they both chose not to compete that year.

Silvia Farina Elia and Francesca Schiavone won in the final 3-6, 6-2, 6-1 against Gisela Dulko and Patricia Tarabini.

Seeds

  Elena Likhovtseva / Vera Zvonareva (semifinals)
  Silvia Farina Elia / Francesca Schiavone (champions)
  Tina Križan / Katarina Srebotnik (first round)
  Elena Bovina / Denisa Chládková (quarterfinals)

Draw

External links
 Draw

JandS Cup - Doubles